75D/Kohoutek is a short-period comet discovered in February 1975, by Luboš Kohoutek. Even on the discovery plate the comet was only apparent magnitude 14. Assuming the comet has not disintegrated the 2020-2021 perihelion passage is only expected to peak around apparent magnitude 20.

Not to be confused with the much better-known C/1973 E1 (Kohoutek), 75D is a repeat visitor to the inner Solar System, with a period of about seven years. It was placed on the discovery orbit when it passed  from Jupiter on 28 July 1972. Apparitions have been dim, with the brightest being in 1988 at about apparent magnitude 13. It was not seen in 1994, 2000, 2007, nor on its last predicted return in 2014. The comet has been estimated to be  in diameter.

This comet was last observed by Mauna Kea on 19 May 1988. The Minor Planet Center has given the comet a "D/" designation as the comet is believed to be lost. The comet is calculated to come to opposition in October 2020 in the constellation of Pisces.

See also
 List of numbered comets

References

External links 
 Orbital simulation from JPL (Java) / Ephemeris
 75D/Kohoutek – Seiichi Yoshida @ aerith.net

Periodic comets
0075
Lost comets
Astronomical objects discovered in 1975